Pkidha was the first Christian bishop of Adiabene, a kingdom in northern Mesopotamia. He held the see from 104 to 114 AD. He was born as a slave of a Zoroastrian master. Tradition says that he saw the missionary Addai from Edessa raise a girl to life and gave his heart to the Lord.

References

Moffet, Samuel. A History of Christianity in Asia. Orbis, 1998.

2nd-century Mesopotamian bishops
Adiabene